Maria Colette Caulfield (born 6 August 1973) is a British politician and nurse serving as Parliamentary Under-Secretary of State for Mental Health and Women's Health Strategy and Parliamentary Under-Secretary of State for Women since October 2022. She served as Minister of State for Health from July to September 2022. A member of the Conservative Party, she has been Member of Parliament (MP) for Lewes since 2015.

Early life and career
Maria Caulfield was born on 6 August 1973 to Irish immigrant parents and grew up on in a working class area of Wandsworth, London. Her father was from a farming family, but after emigration worked as a builder, while her mother was a nurse.

While Caulfield was in her teens, her mother died from breast cancer; after leaving school she became an NHS nurse. She has spoken about her upbringing saying that she "grew up in a run-down area of South London where the only careers advice given to us was the phone number of the local council housing office for when you became a single mum and needed a council flat".

As a nurse, she eventually specialised in cancer research and moved to the south coast of England, where she worked at the Royal Sussex County Hospital and the Princess Royal Hospital and then the Royal Marsden. Her career in the NHS lasted over 20 years. She became involved with the Conservative Party after joining a campaign to save local hospitals in the Brighton area.

Political career

Before Parliament
In the 2007 Brighton and Hove City Council election, Caulfield stood as a Conservative Party candidate and became a member of the local city council for the previously safe Labour ward of Moulsecoomb - winning by just one vote. She served in the cabinet of the then Conservative authority and held the Housing Portfolio. In the following 2011 local election she lost her seat to the Labour candidate by over 600 votes.

At the 2010 general election she unsuccessfully stood in the Caerphilly constituency, a safe Labour seat, coming second to Wayne David, the defending sitting MP. She had been shortlisted for the position of Conservative Party candidate for Gosport in the previous year. She received criticism from local political rivals for both campaigns on the grounds that her focus should be on her council work in Brighton.

For several years, she held the role of deputy regional chairman for the South East Conservatives and was a co-ordinator in the NO2AV campaign in the 2011 AV referendum.

Election to Parliament
In 2013, she was selected for the constituency of Lewes in East Sussex by the Lewes Conservative Association, and at the 2015 general election she overturned a 7,647 majority and defeated the incumbent Liberal Democrat MP Norman Baker. She was re-elected at the 2017 general election.

Caulfield backed Brexit during the 2016 EU membership referendum.

In September 2017, she faced criticism after she hosted a Parliamentary event with the Royal College of Nursing to gain support for scrapping the below-inflation cap on nurses pay but did not take part in a parliamentary debate on this. Defending her position, Caulfield argued the only way to lift the nurses' pay cap would be during a meaningful budget vote.

On 8 January 2018, Caulfield was appointed vice chair of the Conservative Party for Women; the appointment was criticised by women's rights groups, including the Women's Equality Party, because she had opposed a Ten Minute Rule bill in March 2017 which sought to allow abortion to term and for voting in 2015 with the government to oppose the removal of the so-called tampon tax, currently levied on female sanitary products as the UK can currently not zero rate VAT on these products while a member of the EU She resigned from this position on 10 July 2018 in protest at the Brexit strategy of the Prime Minister, Theresa May.

In the House of Commons she sat on the Northern Ireland Affairs Committee, the Women and Equalities Committee and the Committee on Exiting the European Union until becoming a Government whip in 2019.

Caulfield employs her husband as her office manager. The practice of MPs employing family members has been criticised by some sections of the media on the grounds that it promotes nepotism. Although MPs who were first elected in 2017 have been banned from employing family members, the restriction is not retrospective - meaning that Caulfield's employment of her husband is lawful.

On 1 August 2019, Caulfield was made Parliamentary Private Secretary (PPS) to the Secretary of State for Transport Grant Shapps as part of a government reshuffle.

In October 2019, Caulfield signed a letter to The Guardian pledging climate action. Caulfield has also supported plans for a Green Brexit, by enhancing environmental protections after the UK leaves the European Union.

Caulfield was reelected at the 2019 general election with a reduced majority.

In March 2020, Caulfield announced that whilst continuing to fulfill her parliamentary duties, she would be answering the UK government's call for former doctors and nurses to volunteer in order to help the NHS deal with the COVID-19 pandemic.

In May 2020, Caulfield shared a 22-second video clip from her Twitter account which had been doctored to depict the Labour leader, Sir Keir Starmer, apparently giving reasons as to why he, as the director of public prosecutions, had not prosecuted grooming gangs. She accompanied the tweet with the words: "True face of the Labour leader #shameful". In fact, Starmer had been answering a question about what the "wrong approach" was and why historic child sexual abuse allegations had been ignored for decades by the authorities. The doctored video came from a Twitter account that had spread far-right and anti-Islam views, which was subsequently suspended. A Downing Street spokesman said: "These tweets have rightly been deleted. The MPs involved have been spoken to by the Whips' Office and reminded of their responsibility to check the validity of information before they post on social media sites." Caulfield later apologised.

Ministerial career
On 17 September 2021, Caulfield was appointed Parliamentary Under-Secretary of State for Patient Safety and Primary Care in the second cabinet reshuffle of the second Johnson ministry.

On 7 July 2022, she was appointed Minister of State in the Department of Health and Social Care as part of the caretaker cabinet installed by outgoing Prime Minister Boris Johnson.

Return to backbenches
On 7 September 2022 following the appointment of Liz Truss as Prime Minister and the subsequent formation of her ministry, Caulfield was dismissed from her role in Government and returned to the backbenches. 

Caulfield is a former board member of Blue Collar Conservativism.

In October 2022, when Caulfield was appointed Parliamentary Under-Secretary of State for Women, the appointment was criticised by the British Pregnancy Advisory Service because she had voted against buffer zones outside abortion clinics and against legalising abortion in Northern Ireland. She has said that protesters outside abortion clinics might be there in order "to comfort" those entering the clinic.

Personal life
Caulfield lives with her husband Steve Bell, an ex-serviceman and former builder, who works as her office manager. He is a Brighton and Hove City Councillor, as well as being active in the voluntary party and was President (2015–16) of the Conservative National Convention, the organizing body of the voluntary party. She is also a member of the Conservative Christian Fellowship.

Caulfield is an urban shepherdess, part of an environmental project which uses sheep and cattle to graze public open spaces. She previously held a non-executive director position on the board of the housing charity BHT Sussex. She supports Arsenal and Lewes football clubs, and is a shareholder of the latter.

A practising Roman Catholic, Caulfield supports lowering the current abortion time limit. She reports that (at some point prior to July 2022) she had suffered a stroke.

Electoral history

2019 general election

2017 general election

2015 general election

2010 general election

2007 Brighton and Hove City Council election

Notes

References

External links

1973 births
Conservative Party (UK) MPs for English constituencies
Nurses from London
English people of Irish descent
English Roman Catholics
English environmentalists
21st-century British women politicians
Conservative Party (UK) councillors
Female members of the Parliament of the United Kingdom for English constituencies
Living people
People from Wandsworth
Politicians from Brighton and Hove
UK MPs 2015–2017
UK MPs 2017–2019
UK MPs 2019–present
Women councillors in England
21st-century English women
21st-century English people
British Eurosceptics